Martin Gilbert Barrow, GBS, CBE (born 10 March 1944) was an appointed unofficial member of the Legislative Council of Hong Kong (1988–95) and a Company Director of Jardine Matheson. He is notable for being the last Chairman of Jardines' Japan business before the Company exited all its Japanese business interests.

He was also the chairman of the Hong Kong Tourist Association and vice-chairman of the Hong Kong General Chamber of Commerce.

References

1944 births
Living people
People educated at Harrow School
Hong Kong financial businesspeople
Recipients of the Gold Bauhinia Star
Commanders of the Order of the British Empire
HK LegCo Members 1988–1991
HK LegCo Members 1991–1995